Nawabshah is a tehsil and headquarters of the Shaheed Benazirabad District of Sindh province, Pakistan. This city is situated in the middle of Sindh province. It is the 27th largest city in Pakistan. Nawabshah Tehsil (formerly known as Nasrat Tehsil from 1907 to 1909) was established in 1907 by the British government. The tehsil was a part of Hyderabad district (1907 - 1912). On 1 November 1912 Nawabshah was upgraded to a district status of Sind Division.

In 1909, Syed Nawab Ali Shah donated 200 acres of land to British government for construction of a town railway station and 60 acres of land for construction of buildings of district and taluka offices free of cost. To commemorate this, the British government then changed the name of Nasrat town to Nawabshah town

Area and population 2014

Climate

Nawabshah has a hot desert climate (Köppen climate classification BWh). Temperatures above  are fairly common during late May and early June. Winters start late, around mid-November, lasting to around mid-February, with night-time temperatures often reaching , and temperatures below  occurring two or three times on average in January.

The highest temperatures each year in Pakistan, typically rising to above , are usually recorded in Nawabshah District and Sibi from May to August. On 26 May 2010 record breaking severe heat wave hit the city and the mercury level reached  which was the highest temperature ever recorded in Nawabshah at the time. The highest annual rainfall ever is 685 mm, recorded in 2022.

Education 
There are various educational institutions in the city, these include:

Sports 

 Bilawal Stadium Shaheed Benazirabad
 Hockey Stadium Nawabshah

Gallery

See also

Climate of Pakistan
Climate of Sindh

References

External links 
 
Pakistan Meteorological Department

Cities in Pakistan
Populated places in Shaheed Benazir Abad District